The Southwest Conference women's basketball tournament, also called the SWC Classic, was the conference championship tournament in women's basketball for the Southwest Conference. The tournament was held annually between 1983 and 1996, after which the Southwest Conference was dissolved.

The winner of the tournament was guaranteed a spot in the NCAA basketball tournament each year.

Champions
Source

Championships by school

See also
 Big 12 Conference women's basketball tournament
 SEC women's basketball tournament
 Conference USA women's basketball tournament
 Southwest Conference men's basketball tournament

References

 
Recurring sporting events established in 1983